Edgar C. Whisenant (September 25, 1932 – May 16, 2001) was a former NASA engineer and Bible student who predicted the rapture would occur in 1988, sometime between Sept. 11 and Sept. 13. He published two books about this, 88 Reasons Why the Rapture Will Be in 1988 and On Borrowed Time. Eventually, 300,000 copies of 88 Reasons were mailed free of charge to ministers across America, and 4.5 million copies were sold in bookstores and elsewhere. Whisenant was quoted as saying "Only if the Bible is in error am I wrong; and I say that to every preacher in town" and "[I]f there were a king in this country and I could gamble with my life, I would stake my life on Rosh Hashana 88."

Publications
  Predicted that the Rapture would occur in 1988.
  Predicted that the Rapture would occur in 1989.
  Predicted that the Rapture would occur in 1993.
  Prediction for 1994.

See also
 Unfulfilled Christian religious predictions

References

External links
  On Borrowed Time: The Bible Dates of The 70th Week of Daniel, Armageddon and The Millennium by Edgar C. Whisenant
 88 Reasons Why the Rapture Will Be in 1988 by Edgar C. Whisenant
88 Reasons Why The Rapture Will Be In 1988 and On Borrowed Time at archive.org: https://archive.org/details/ReasonsWhyTheRaptureWillBeIn1988PDF

1932 births
2001 deaths
20th-century American male writers
20th-century apocalypticists
20th-century evangelicals
21st-century evangelicals
Christian writers about eschatology
Evangelical writers